Leandro Rubén Caruso (born 14 July 1982, in Avellaneda) is an Argentine football striker.

Career 

Caruso started playing for Independiente's youth divisions, in his native city of Avellaneda. Later, following his brother Hernán's footsteps, he played futsal in Racing. After seeing some success, he returned to the big field training with Racing's reserves.

In 2001, he started his professional career with Arsenal de Sarandí. He was part of the squad that won promotion to the Argentine Primera in 2002. He then played for a number of lower league teams in Mexico including Pioneros de Ciudad Obregón, Tijuana and Real Colima; as well as El Porvenir in the Primera B Nacional (Argentine second division).

In 2008, he returned to Argentina to join Godoy Cruz of the 2nd division, where he helped the club to secure promotion to the Primera. He maintained his good form when playing in the first division, scoring 14 goals in the 2008–09 season.

On 9 June 2009 Udinese Calcio signed the Argentine forward from Godoy Cruz on a 5 year-deal, to officially join the club after the season. The deal was made in €4,000,000. Caruso played the last game for Godoy Cruz on 21 June 2009.

On 19 August 2009 Vélez Sársfield signed the Argentine forward on loan from Udinese for one season, with an option to buy. Caruso had his first great game with Vélez in the 2–2 away draw against Unión Española on the 2009 Copa Sudamericana, where he scored twice to secure Vélez' comeback from a 0–2. The team qualified for the next stage with a 5–4 global victory. On 19 June 2010 River Plate loaned the Argentine forward from Udinese until 30 June 2011. On 12 August 2011, Caruso joined Godoy Cruz, where he spent the 2008–2009 season, on a season-long loan deal.

Clubs

References

External links
 Profile at Vélez Sársfield's official website
 ESPN statistics
 Argentine Primera Statistics at Fútbol XXI
 Career details at BDFA

1982 births
Living people
Sportspeople from Avellaneda
Argentine people of Italian descent
Argentine footballers
Argentine expatriate footballers
Expatriate footballers in Mexico
Association football forwards
Arsenal de Sarandí footballers
Godoy Cruz Antonio Tomba footballers
Club Atlético Vélez Sarsfield footballers
Club Atlético River Plate footballers
Argentinos Juniors footballers
Argentine Primera División players
Citizens of Italy through descent
Italian sportspeople of Argentine descent
Argentine expatriate sportspeople in Italy
Argentine expatriate sportspeople in Mexico